Nyayo National Stadium is a multi-purpose stadium in Nairobi, Kenya. It is located at the square of Mombasa Road, Langata Road and the Aerodrome Road. It is approximately two kilometers from the City Center, directly opposite Nairobi Mega Mall, formerly known as Nakumatt Mega. The stadium was built in 1983 for a capacity of 15,000. It is currently used mostly for football matches. The popular AFC Leopards football club plays most of its home games at Nyayo stadium. The stadium is also used for athletics , swimming and various ceremonies most common of which are National Holiday celebrations. Other facilities at the Nyayo Stadium include a gymnasium and a 50-metre swimming pool. Rugby union club Mwamba RFC used the Nyayo National Stadium for home games.

The completion of the Nyayo Stadium gave Kenya the opportunity to be placed in the category of nations that were invited to bid for the 4th All-Africa Games in 1987, a bid that was awarded to Kenya, giving it International status. In essence, the Nyayo Stadium "gave birth" to Moi International Sports Centre.

The Nyayo Stadium was the host venue of the 2010 African Championships in Athletics.

The stadium was renamed to the Coca-Cola National Stadium after the multi-national company won the naming rights to the stadium in February 2009. The deal was worth US$1.5 million and would have seen the beverage company do branding, marketing and naming to the whole stadium for three years. Three months later, however, Coca-Cola withdrew from the contract, because the Kenyan government wanted to have the stadium branded as Coca-Cola Nyayo National Stadium. but was renamed again to the Nyayo National Stadium, as the Government of Kenya wanted it branded. This decision has been widely criticised by many Kenyan citizens, because they believe that Coca-Cola would have heavily improved and popularised the stadium.

The stadium houses headquarters for the Football Kenya Federation and Athletics Kenya.

Components

Main stadium
The main stadium, holding 15,000 people and a FIFA-approved standard-size football pitch, also contains floodlights, 2 VIP lounges, a boardroom and an internet-enabled media centre. The stadium can also be and has also been used to host concerts, public holiday celebrations, public rallies, meetings and crusades.

Aquatic Centre
The aquatic centre holds 2,000 people and contains a filtration plant and a public 50 x 25 m swimming pool.

Indoor Gymnasium
The indoor gymnasium holds 2,500 people and is the home of the Kenya National Basketball League and the Kenya national basketball team. It also features floodlights, electronic scoreboards, snack bars, a boxing ring, an indoor badminton court, a martial arts gym and other social facilities.

Handball and volleyball training courts
The handball and volleyball courts can accommodate up to 1,500 spectators and feature outdoor training courts.

References

External links
 Sports Stadia Management Board – A body governing few stadiums in Kenya, including the Moi International Sports Centre
Photo at WorldStadiums.com
Photos at FussballTempel.net
Videos at NairobiKenya.com

Sports venues completed in 1983
Football venues in Kenya
Sports venues in Kenya
Sport in Nairobi
Kenya
Multi-purpose stadiums in Kenya
1980s in Nairobi